Murder in the Air (aka The Enemy Within) is a 1940 American drama film with science fiction elements directed by Lewis Seiler and written by Raymond L. Schrock. The film stars Ronald Reagan, John Litel, Lya Lys, James Stephenson, Eddie Foy, Jr., Robert Warwick and Victor Zimmerman. Murder in the Air was released by Warner Bros. on June 1, 1940.

Plot
Agent Saxby (John Litel), the head of the Secret Service in the U.S. Treasury Department, assigns agent Lieutenant "Brass" Bancroft (Ronald Reagan) to impersonate a deceased spy Steve Swenko. Gabby Watters (Eddie Foy, Jr.), Brass's assistant, finds a letter in the dead spy's shoe, addressed to Joe Garvey (James Stephenson), the leader of a group being investigated by the Rice Committee on Unamerican Activities.

Swenko's wife, Hilda Riker (Lya Lys) finds out her husband is dead and recognizes Bancroft as an imposter. Before she can alert Garvey that there is a federal agent about, Gabby, posing as a taxi driver, follows Brass to Hilda's apartment and comes to his rescue.

An unwitting Garvey assigns Bancroft to board the U.S. Navy dirigible U.S.S. Mason on which an "Inertia Projector," a death-ray/laser gun, is mounted. Once aboard, Bancroft is to contact Rumford (Victor Zimmerman), a spy posing as an assistant to Dr. Finchley (Robert Warwick), a member of the League of Nations.

While he steals the plans for the inertia projector, Rumford orders Bancroft to destroy the dirigible but Garvey and Rumford learn Bancroft is a government agent. When the dirigible crashes during a storm, Rumford steals the plans and leaves the unconscious Bancroft to die in the crash.

After Brass is rescued and taken to a Navy hospital, Garvey plans to fly Rumford and the stolen documents across the border. Saxby is alerted, and in a spectacular air chase, Garvey's aircraft is shot down by the inertia projector, sending both spies to their death in a burst of flames.

Cast

 Ronald Reagan as "Brass" Bancroft/ Steve Swenko
 John Litel as Saxby
 Lya Lys as Hilda Riker
 James Stephenson as Joe Garvey
 Eddie Foy, Jr. as Gabby Watters
 Robert Warwick as Doctor Finchley
 Victor Zimmerman as Rumford
 William Gould as Admiral Winfield
 Kenneth Harlan as Commander Wayne
 Frank Wilcox as Hotel Clerk
 Owen King as George Hayden
 Dick Rich as John Kramer
 Charles Brokaw as Otto
 Helen Lynd as Dolly

Production
The aircraft in Murder in the Air are:
 Douglas DC-2
 Douglas DC-3
 Boeing 247 c/n 1736, NC13354
 Travel Air 6000
 Stearman C3R
 Buhl Airsedan

Reception
Film reviewer Bosley Crowther, in his review for The New York Times, enjoyed 'Murder in the Air', "Ronald Reagan and the Warners' FBI agents have the situation well in hand. After some sixty minutes of highly incredible melodramatic incident, the government's prized 'inertia projector' is rescued from foreign hands and the saboteurs are either killed off or jailed. (The 'inertia projector' is an instrument which fouls electric current at the source; its amazing practicality is illustrated when it is focused on the plane in which the enemy agents attempt to flee the country.) Mr. Reagan, who had seen service previously with the Warners' FBI force, handles his role of counter-espionage agent with the customary daring. Eddie Foy Jr. has a few good comical moments, and Lya Lys of the golden tresses makes an attractive Mata Hari. The screen play by Raymond Schrock is compact, if not 'original', and the direction by Lewis Seiler is swiftly paced. All of which tends to make 'Murder in the Air' acceptable program fare."

Aviation film historian James H, Farmer in Celluloid Wings: The Impact of Movies on Aviation (1984), described Murder in the Air as, "... an action-packed thriller."

References

Notes

Citations

Bibliography

 Farmer, James H. Celluloid Wings: The Impact of Movies on Aviation. Blue Ridge Summit, Pennsylvania: Tab Books Inc., 1984. .
 Pendo, Stephen. Aviation in the Cinema. Lanham, Maryland: Scarecrow Press, 1985. .

External links
 
 

1940 films
American aviation films
Warner Bros. films
American drama films
1940 drama films
Films directed by Lewis Seiler
American black-and-white films
Films about the United States Secret Service
1940s English-language films
1940s American films